Margaret Conditt is a former Republican member of the Ohio House of Representatives, who has represented the 52nd District since her appointment in 2011. She was elected to the seat in November 2012, winning 66 percent of the vote. She defeated Democratic candidate Branden Rudie (27.08 percent) and independent candidate Robert Coogan (6.92 percent). She was re-elected to the seat in November 2014, winning 76% of the vote.

References

1953 births
Living people
Republican Party members of the Ohio House of Representatives
People from Middletown, Ohio
University of Colorado alumni